"Hero" is a song by Spanish singer-songwriter Enrique Iglesias from his second English-language studio album Escape (2001). It was written by Iglesias, Paul Barry and Mark Taylor. Interscope Records released the song on 3 September 2001 to a positive critical and commercial reception. To the date the single has sold over 8 million copies worldwide, making it one of the best selling singles of all time.

After the 11 September attacks on the World Trade Center, which took place eight days after the single was released, "Hero" was one of the few songs chosen by radio DJs in New York City to be remixed with audio from police, firefighters, civilians at Ground Zero, and politicians commenting on the attacks. Iglesias was asked to sing the song live at America: A Tribute to Heroes. He had performed the song earlier at that year's Miss Venezuela, but due to the terrorist attacks the show was not aired on television.

The American television series Glee featured a version of the song as a mashup mixed with the Gipsy Kings' "Bamboléo". The release from the twelfth episode (called "The Spanish Teacher") in season 3 of the show is named "Bambolero/Hero". The main vocals were done by Chord Overstreet (playing the character Sam Evans). An Italian version of this song was covered by Micheal Castaldo, in his studio album Bergamot.

Background
"Hero" has a meaning of love and assurance with a desire to be a hero for the love of a woman. Iglesias stated that his high school days were the inspiration for the song. During a 2013 radio interview with Ryan Seacrest, he stated, "I went back to when I was 17 in high school, and this might be cheesy, but I thought about what would be the song I want to slow dance to with my prom date. When I wrote it, it felt good and ... I thought I know there is something special in this song."

"Hero" was first released on 3 September 2001, just eight days prior to the 11 September attacks on the World Trade Center. Due to the song's subject matter, it was one of the few songs chosen by radio DJs in New York City to be remixed with audio from police, firefighters, civilians at Ground Zero, and politicians commenting on the attacks. Iglesias was also asked to sing the song live at the America: A Tribute to Heroes benefit concert, which took place on 21 September. His performance was broadcast from a warehouse in New York alongside Bruce Springsteen, Bon Jovi, and Sheryl Crow. The location of the warehouse was kept secret in case of further attacks. It was Iglesias's first televised performance of the song. He had performed the song earlier at that year's Miss Venezuela, but due to the terrorist attacks the show was not aired on television.

Chart performance
"Hero" topped many charts in the US including the Billboard adult contemporary chart for fifteen weeks. On the latter, the song would re-enter the top ten a year later, the first song ever to do so. The song peaked at number three on the Billboard Hot 100 chart, though it is actually his most played song on the chart, outdoing prior singles "Bailamos" and "Be with You", both of which went to number one on the chart. A remixed recording also topped the Billboard Hot Dance Club Play chart in January 2002.

In January 2002, the song was released in the UK, where it debuted at number 86 before jumping 85 places to number one, where it remained for four weeks. Up to this point, Iglesias had already had two hits in the UK ("Bailamos" and "Could I Have This Kiss Forever") but was still largely unknown. "Hero" was seen as his breakthrough in the UK and it became the third best-selling single of 2002 there, whilst Escape was also the third best-selling album of the year. With sales of 836,500, "Hero" was the 17th best-selling single of the 2000s in the UK. In April 2015, it was announced that the song had sold 1 million copies in the UK.

In Australia, the song reached number one on the ARIA Chart, becoming his first number-one in that country. The song also topped the charts in Spain, Switzerland, Romania, Ireland and Canada. This is one of Iglesias' best-selling singles and has sold 8 million copies.

Music videos
The music video for "Hero" was directed by Joseph Kahn. It features Iglesias as an honorable criminal hunted by his enemies, while Jennifer Love Hewitt plays his love interest and Mickey Rourke plays one of the men hunting him. The video follows Iglesias and Hewitt running from their enemies in the desert. Finally, Iglesias' enemies track him down and confront him outside a church. The confrontation leads to Iglesias being floored by Rourke, before being struck with a baton. The video skips ahead where Iglesias and Hewitt are seen in the rain surrounded by police cars. Iglesias, though heavily injured, walks towards Hewitt and breaks down beside her. The video ends with Iglesias' death.

In addition to this video, a second video was made for the UK with less violence. The final shot of this video shows Iglesias' legs moving, suggesting that he's not dead. While originally made for the UK, this version has since replaced the original video on many music video stations throughout the world. It is also the version shown on Vevo and YouTube.

Portions of the video were filmed in the ghost town Amboy, California in the Mojave Desert and just outside Desert Hot Springs, California near Palm Springs. The historic gas station location that they filmed at, outside of Desert Hot Springs, was one of the first gas stations in the Palm Springs area. As of 31 July 2021, the video has been viewed 415 million times on YouTube.

Awards and nominations

Track listings
UK CD1
 "Hero" (Album Version) – 4:24
 "Hero" (Metro Mix – English Version) – 3:28
 "Bailamos" (Album Version) – 3:37
 "Hero" (Video) – 4:24

UK CD2 – The Remixes
 "Hero" (Metro Mix – English Version) – 4:19
 "Hero" (Ventura & Colombo Remix) – 3:43
 "Hero" (Metro Mix – Spanish Version) – 4:19
 "Hero" (Thunderpuss Radio Edit) – 3:18

DE CD single
 "Hero" (Radio Edit) – 4:11
 "Be With You" (Thunderpuss Radio Mix) – 3:56
 "Hero" (Metro Mix – Spanish Version) – 4:19

Japanese CD single
 "Hero" (Radio Edit) – 4:11
 "Be With You" (Thunderpuss 2000 Remix) – 7:46
 "Hero" (Metro Mix – Spanish Version) – 3:28

Japanese "Hero/Escape" maxi single
 "Hero" (Album Version) – 4:27
 "Escape" (Album Version) – 3:30
 "Hero" (Instrumental Version) – 4:23

Charts

Weekly charts

Year-end charts

Decade-end charts

All-time charts

Certifications

Release history

CNCO version
On 4 December 2020, Latin boyband CNCO released a cover version of the song 20 years after the original. The single is accompanied with a music video, in its turn being a tribute to the visual direction of the Backstreet Boys' 1999 music video "Show Me the Meaning of Being Lonely". The track "Hero" appeared on the band's cover album Déja Vu in 2021. The group also recorded a Spanish version for the deluxe edition of their album. CNCO previously worked with Iglesias on a remix of his 2017 song "Súbeme la Radio".

Television and film soundtracks
"Hero" has become wildly popular due in part to the fact that it has been featured in many television shows and movies around the world. The earliest appearance of the song on an American television show was on a 2001 episode of The WB show Smallville entitled "Craving". Since then the song has been featured in such American sitcoms and reality television shows as Scrubs, Saturday Night Live: The Best of Jimmy Fallon, Glee, The X Factor, So You Think You Can Dance, Dancing with the Stars and the miniseries I Love the New Millennium.  The song has also been featured in such international television shows as Hinter Gittern – Der Frauenknast and So You Think You Can Dance Canada. Numerous films also feature the song, including Hot Tub Time Machine, Premios Amigo 2001, Zoom, Lady Godiva, Drillbit Taylor, Don Quixote, and Beverly Hills Chihuahua.

Although the song has appeared in many television shows and movies, the first televised performance of the song was scheduled to be Iglesias's performance of the song at Miss Venezuela on 11 September 2001, but this performance was not televised due to the terrorist attacks on that day. The actual first televised performance of the song was when Iglesias performed the song at the America: A Tribute to Heroes concert on 21 September, ten days after the attacks.

See also
 List of number-one singles of 2001 (Canada)
 List of number-one Billboard Hot Latin Tracks of 2002
 List of number-one dance singles of 2001 (U.S.)
 List of Billboard Adult Contemporary number ones of 2001 and 2002 (U.S.)
 List of number-one singles in Australia in 2002
 List of number-one singles of 2002 (Ireland)
 List of Romanian Top 100 number ones of the 2000s
 List of number-one singles from the 2000s (UK)

References

2000s ballads
2001 songs
2001 singles
2002 singles
Canadian Singles Chart number-one singles
Enrique Iglesias songs
Interscope Records singles
Irish Singles Chart number-one singles
Music videos directed by Joseph Kahn
Number-one singles in Australia
Number-one singles in Poland
Number-one singles in Portugal
Number-one singles in Romania
Number-one singles in Scotland
Number-one singles in Spain
Pop ballads
Song recordings produced by Mark Taylor (record producer)
Songs written by Enrique Iglesias
Songs written by Mark Taylor (record producer)
Songs written by Paul Barry (songwriter)
UK Singles Chart number-one singles